Vizhay is a rural locality (a settlement) in Cherdynsky District, Perm Krai, Russia. The population was 179 as of 2010. There are 5 streets.

Geography 
Vizhay is located 133 km northeast of Cherdyn (the district's administrative centre) by road. Valay is the nearest rural locality.

References 

Rural localities in Cherdynsky District